Phillipena Noël,  (30 July 1910 to 7 December 2003) best known by the name Ena Noël, was an inspirational school teacher and advocate for children's literature and library services to children and young adults. Ena Noël's name is synonymous in Australia with children's literature and with IBBY, the International Board on Books for Young People.

Early life
Ena was born in Sydney on 30 July 1910 to Russian immigrant parents.  From childhood Ena developed an interest in all forms of art and literature, especially music, theatre and dance. Inspired by the first Bodenwieser Ballet performed in Sydney in 1939, she trained in ballet under Gertrud Bodenwieser. After dancing with the Bodenwieser Group for some years, Ena conducted a dance studio at Rose Bay for some twenty years. In 1952–53 she toured Britain and Europe with a solo lecture-dance program entitled The life cycle of an Australian Aboriginal woman, dancing to John Antill's music for Corroboree. She performed, representing Australia, in the festivities for the Royal coronation in 1953.

In 1940 Ena married Arthur Charles Noël, a British sea captain. After her husband's death in 1966, Ena, although remaining passionate about dance, pursued an academic career. From the University of Sydney she obtained a Bachelor of Arts and Diploma of Education. At first she taught English and History at various high schools. While teaching at Dover Heights Girls High School she became convinced that her highest goal was to turn young people into enthusiastic and discriminating readers by working in school libraries. In 1958 Ena was appointed librarian at South Sydney Boys High.

Contribution to children's literature
Ena was invited to speak at many international conferences and from 1982 to 1986 served on the International Board on Books for Young People international executive committee. She believed literature to be a potent force in international understanding and goodwill. Ena's crowning moment in IBBY and in promoting Australian children's literature internationally was no doubt her achievement in 1986 of successfully nominating Patricia Wrightson for the IBBY Hans Christian Andersen Medal for the body of her writing for children, and Robert Ingpen the IBBY Hans Christian Andersen Medal for his illustrations of children's books. This is the only time that both of these awards have gone to the same country in the same year.

She was a respected critic of children's literature and contributed articles to international journals such as Bookbird. In 1971 she organised Australia's only entry for the Biennial of Illustrations in Bratislava; and in 1992 she was the Australian judge for the American Ezra Jack Keats Award in children's literature.

For her services to children's literature Ena Noël received the Children's Book Council's Lady Cutler Award in 1983, and in 1986 she was presented with the Medal of the Order of Australia. On the occasion of the Lady Cutler Award it was said: 'In the world of children's literature Ena Noël's name is a password nationally and internationally. It is a password amongst those who believe that literature of quality and integrity is a powerful potential in the growth of children's imagination, insight and understanding – understanding of themselves, their society and their world; that books can be bridges linking person to person, culture to culture, nation to nation.'

Maurice Saxby was nominated by Ena Noël, and then elected to the jury of the Hans Christian Andersen Award in 1984 and 1986.

Ena Noël Award for Encouragement

In 1994, Ena Noël founded the Ena Noel Award for Encouragement to encourage young, emerging Australian writers and illustrators.  The award is a mounted silver medallion designed by the first winner of the award, the Australian Aboriginal writer/illustrator Arone Raymond Meeks.  The Award is presented biennially by IBBY Australia at the Australian Library and Information Association Conference.  A list of the award winners is included in the IBBY Australia entry.

Contribution to children's librarianship
From 1956 to 1974 she was renowned for her skill as a teacher-librarian – especially at Fort St Girls High (now known as Fort Street High School).  Ena Noël and Margaret Trask were early leaders in the Library Association of Australia's School and Children's Libraries Section. Ena Noël co-ordinated and lectured at short summer courses in secondary school librarianship at the University of Sydney in the 1960s.

Awards
 1983: Children's Book Council of Australia's Lady Cutler Award for services to children's literature
 1984: the General Council of the Library Association of Australia (now the Australian Library and Information Association) created a special award, the Ellinor Archer Award, which recognised her great contributions to the development of school and children's libraries.
 1986: Medal of the Order of Australia for "service to libraries, especially in the field of children's literature".
 1994: Ena founded her own biennial prize – the Ena Noël Award – to encourage young emerging writers and illustrators, which is presented at the ALIA Biennial Conference.

References

 Phillipena (Ena) Noël, AOM, 1910–2003 (Obituary) Maurice Saxby Incite January – February 2004 
 The Ena Noel Award for Encouragement (Australia) John Foster. Bookbird. Basel: 2007. Vol. 45, Iss. 3; p. 46 
 The Australian IBBY Encouragement Award for Children's Literature Ena Noel. Bookbird. Basel: May 2003. Vol. 41, Iss. 2; p. 62 
 The New classics: a selection of award-winning children's books. 1990 / edited by Ena Noel 
 Able to enjoy; books and the young disabled: papers presented at the Australian National Section of IBBY Conference on Children's Literature, Sydney, 1981 / edited by Ena Noel

External links
 Australian Library and Information Association (ALIA)
 International Board on Books for Young People (IBBY)
 IBBY Australia
 Children's Book Council of Australia
 Ena Noel Encouragement Award
 Ena Noel Encouragement Award titles in LibraryThing

1910 births
2003 deaths
Australian Library and Information Association
Australian librarians
Australian women librarians
People from New South Wales
Recipients of the Medal of the Order of Australia